Cornell Desmond Brown (born March 15, 1975) is  a former American college and professional football player who was a linebacker in the National Football League (NFL) for seven seasons.  He played college football for Virginia Tech, and earned All-American honors twice.  Drafted late in the sixth round of the 1997 NFL Draft, he played professionally for the NFL's Baltimore Ravens.  He is currently a defensive ends coach for Marshall. In 2013, Brown was inducted into the Virginia Sports Hall of Fame (the state-wide organization that honors sports figures from the state, or who contributed to sports programs in the state).

Early years
Born in Englewood, New Jersey, Brown attended E.C. Glass in Lynchburg, Virginia.  He played high school football for the E.C. Glass Hilltoppers, and led them to the state championship game in his senior year in 1992, losing to the Bethel High School team.

College career
Brown attended Virginia Polytechnic Institute and State University, where he played for coach Frank Beamer's Virginia Tech Hokies football team from 1993 to 1996.  He earned first-team All-American honors as a defensive end in 1995, and was recognized as a consensus first-team All-American in 1996.  He was inducted into the Virginia Tech Sports Hall of Fame in 2007.

Professional career
With the Ravens, he had success as a backup outside linebacker. He earned a Super Bowl ring when Baltimore defeated the New York Giants 34–7 in Super Bowl XXXV. Brown was hit with a drug charge in 2001 however, and was cut, although the charge was eventually dropped. After going back to Virginia Tech for a year, Brown was picked up by the Oakland Raiders. In his seven NFL seasons, he played in 108 regular season games, started twenty-five of them, and compiled 147 tackles, seven quarterback sacks and three forced fumbles.
Brown was inducted into the Virginia Sports Hall of Fame in 2013.

Coaching
Brown began his coaching career as an intern with the NFL Europe Cologne Centurions in 2005, then spent 2006 and 2007 as defensive line coach for the Frankfurt Galaxy in the spring and a graduate assistant on Frank Beamer's Virginia Tech coaching staff in the fall.  Brown joined the Calgary staff in 2008.

Brown was hired by Virginia Tech as the outside linebackers and assistant defensive line coach in 2011.

Brown was hired by Norfolk State University to be the Defensive Coordinator in 2016

Brown was hired by Marshall University to be the Defensive Ends coach in 2017

Brown was hired by Tarleton State to be the Defensive Line coach in 2021.

Football family
Brown's brother is Ruben Brown, who was a Pro Bowl offensive lineman for the Buffalo Bills and Chicago Bears.

References

1975 births
Living people
All-American college football players
American football linebackers
Baltimore Ravens players
Oakland Raiders players
Calgary Stampeders coaches
Frankfurt Galaxy coaches
Virginia Tech Hokies football coaches
Virginia Tech Hokies football players